Maharashtra State Highway 246, commonly referred to as MH SH 246, is a normal state highway in Nagpur, in the state of Maharashtra.  This state highway touches Sawargoan, Narkhed and Mowad.

Summary 

This road is  one of the important road for Narkhed taluka, touching three important place and providing connectivity with Katol, Nagpur, Warud and the rest of India.

Major junctions 

This highway started from the intersection at Sawargoan village with MH SH 247  and end at Mowad town connecting with MH SH 245 in Narkhed taluka, Nagpur District.

Connections 
Many villages, cities and towns in Nagpur District are connected by this state highway.
Sawargoan
Yeni-Koni
Pimpalgoan (w)
Kamthi (t)
Narkhed Town
Belona
Mowad Town

See also 
 List of State Highways in Maharashtra

References 

State Highways in Maharashtra
State Highways in Nagpur District